Morgi may refer to:
Thomas Morgenstern, Austrian ski jumper
Morgi, Greater Poland Voivodeship (west-central Poland)
Morgi, Inowrocław County in Kuyavian-Pomeranian Voivodeship (north-central Poland)
Morgi, Łódź Voivodeship (central Poland)
Morgi, Nowy Dwór Mazowiecki County in Masovian Voivodeship (east-central Poland)
Morgi, Sokółka County in Podlaskie Voivodeship (north-east Poland)
Morgi, Suwałki County in Podlaskie Voivodeship (north-east Poland)
Morgi, Żyrardów County in Masovian Voivodeship (east-central Poland)
Morgi, Mysłowice in Silesian Voivodeship (south Poland)
Morgi, Telangana in southern India